Lactiplantibacillus paraplantarum is a rod-shaped species of lactic acid bacteria first isolated from beer and human faeces. It is facultatively heterofermentative. Strain CNRZ 1885 (= CIP 104668) is the type strain.

References

Further reading

External links

Type strain of Lactobacillus paraplantarum at BacDive -  the Bacterial Diversity Metadatabase

Lactobacillaceae
Bacteria described in 2000